Yle Radio Suomi is a radio channel owned and operated by Finland's national public service broadcaster Yleisradio (Yle). The station's main focus is on music and sport, but it carries a variety of other programmes, including news and phone-ins, as well as up to eight hours a day of regional programming on weekdays (six hours on Saturdays). The channel is also noted for its live coverage of music festivals.

Yle Radio Suomi was established in June 1990 – as part of Yle's restructuring of its radio channels – to be a national network bringing together the country's 20 regional stations. In 2003, the channel's music policy was shifted with the aim of attracting a younger audience. Yle Radio Suomi has consistently been Finland's most listened-to radio station, with a 44% overall audience share in 1999 and a 33% overall share (higher among older listeners) in 2013–2014.

References

This article includes material derived from its counterpart in the Finnish-language Wikipedia :fi:Yle Radio Suomi.

External links
 Official website

Yle radio stations